The Egmont Palace, also sometimes known as the Arenberg Palace, is a neoclassical palace in Brussels, Belgium. It was originally built between 1548 and 1560 for Countess Françoise of Luxembourg and Lamoral, Count of Egmont, though its appearance was heavily modified in the 18th century. It was partly destroyed by fire in 1892, after which it was once again reconstructed. Today, it houses the Belgian Ministry of Foreign Affairs.

The palace is situated in the Sablon/Zavel district (south-eastern part of Brussels' city centre), between the / and the /. This site is served by Porte de Namur/Naamsepoort metro station (on lines 2 and 6 of the Brussels Metro), as well as the tram stop Petit Sablon/Kleine Zavel (on lines 92 and 93).

History
Its fabric was dramatically transformed in the 18th century, when the property passed onto the Arenberg family, and the building was clothed in a neoclassical style. The plans for this stage are attributed to the early advocate of neoclassicism, Giovanni Niccolò Servandoni. After a fire demolished the oldest part of the building in 1892, it was reconstructed by the architect  in a uniform neoclassical style.

The Egmont Palace was the host venue of the fencing events for the 1920 Summer Olympics in the garden. After World War I, the German Arenberg family was forced to sell the property to the City of Brussels. 
During this time, the buildings, hardly recovering from the 1892 fire, were again damaged by fire in 1927 and 1959. In 1964, the property was sold to the Belgian State, which undertook its extensive restoration and redecoration. In 1977, the Egmont Pact on the Belgian State reform was signed in the Egmont Palace during the second administration of then-Prime Minister Leo Tindemans.

Since 11 September 1992, the palace has been listed as a protected monument by the Monuments and Sites Directorate of the Brussels-Capital Region. Nowadays, it is used for receptions and meetings by the Belgian Ministry of Foreign Affairs and hosts many events organised by the Royal Institute for International Relations (also known as the Egmont Institute).

See also
 Egmont Group of Financial Intelligence Units
 List of castles and châteaux in Belgium
 Neoclassical architecture in Belgium
 History of Brussels
 Belgium in "the long nineteenth century"

References

Notes

Bibliography

External links

 Egmont Conference Centre

Palaces in Brussels
City of Brussels
Government buildings in Belgium
Protected heritage sites in Brussels
Neoclassical architecture in Belgium
Neoclassical palaces
Houses completed in 1560
Venues of the 1920 Summer Olympics
Olympic fencing venues